Gum printing is a way of making photographic reproductions without the use of silver halides. The process uses salts of dichromate in common with a number of other related processes such as sun printing.

When mixtures of mucilaginous, protein-containing materials together with soluble salts of dichromate are exposed to ultraviolet light, the protein content becomes tanned and resistant to solution in water. The untanned material can be washed away in warm water leaving a hardened, tanned protein negative.

For gum printing a solution of gum arabic is mixed with either potassium or ammonium dichromate. The higher the proportion of dichromate, the more sensitive the mixture. However, increasing the concentration of dichromate also reduces the contrast which is very low at best. The right concentration of dichromate is always a compromise between speed and contrast.

Using ammonium dichromate allows concentrations up to 15% of the active ingredient whereas potassium dichromate is limited to about 10%. Exceeding these concentrations results in deposits of chromic acid in the dried film which ruins any attempts at printing. The greatest sensitivity expressed as an ASA speed rating is estimated to be about ASA 0.003.
The resulting mucilaginous mixture is spread on a suitable base and allowed to dry in the dark. A contact negative the same size of the finished print is then placed on top of the dried coating and exposed to an ultraviolet light source, typically bright sunshine.
  
Often more than one negative is used to provide detail in all tonal ranges. Using multiple exposures requires very careful registration.  In exposing the paper, the thinnest parts of the negatives will allow the most exposure and cause the areas to be darker. The densest parts of the negative require more exposure.

The exposed print is then developed gradually in a succession of trays of still water (approximately ten-minute intervals) at room temperature until the bath water is clear. The gum is soft and easily removed at this stage. The negative is then carefully dried when the negative image will be visible as raised areas of clear colourless gum. This surface can then be inked using proprietary oil-based printing ink and impressions made using a simple pressure printing press. Each negative can be made to yield several copies or even copies in different colours. However the fragile nature of the dried gum surface usually will restrict re-use to only one or two copies.

See also
 Gum bichromate

References
 The gum bichromate process
 Illustrated Gum Printing Tutorials and works

Photographic processes